= Borissos =

Town of ancient Cappadocia

Coordinates: 38°20′56″N 34°26′34″E

Borissos was a town of ancient Cappadocia, inhabited in Byzantine times.

Its site is tentatively located near Sofular, Asiatic Turkey.
